The Nesse is a river in Werra-Meißner District, North Hessen, Germany. It is 5.9 km long. It flows into the Werra near Herleshausen.

Notes

Rivers of Hesse
Rivers of Germany